Sary-Ozek (Saryözek) is a city in the Almaty Region of Kazakhstan, in the southeastern part of the country. Sary-Ozek is 900 km southeast of the capital Nur-Sultan. Sary-Ozek is 932 meters above sea level and the population is around 14,000.

References

Cities and towns in Kazakhstan
Populated places in Almaty Region